Maurice Tillotson (born on 20 January 1944) is a former association football player who represented New Zealand.

Born in Yorkshire, Tillotson signed as a full-time professional with Huddersfield Town at the age of seventeen. He also played in the English Football League with Stockport County, and had a short spell with Toronto Italia FC in the Eastern Canada Professional Soccer League. Tillotson then moved to Royal Antwerp FC of Belgium where he played in several European Cup games.

TiIlotson moved to New Zealand in 1971 and played three seasons for Gisborne City FC in the National League. During this time was selected for the national team and was voted New Zealand Player of the Year in 1973. He then moved to Stop Out Sports Club where he was player-coach of Stop Out's most successful National League side.

Tillotson made his full All Whites debut in a 4–1 win over New Caledonia on 17 September 1972 and ended his international playing career with 15 A-international caps and 1 goal to his credit, his final cap earned in a 1–1 draw with Macao on 5 November 1975.

References

External links

1944 births
Living people
New Zealand association footballers
New Zealand international footballers
Huddersfield Town A.F.C. players
Stockport County F.C. players
Royal Antwerp F.C. players
Gisborne City AFC players
Stop Out players
Manurewa AFC players
Association football defenders
New Zealand women's national football team managers
1973 Oceania Cup players
English football managers
English expatriate sportspeople in New Zealand
Expatriate association footballers in New Zealand
English expatriate footballers
Caversham AFC players
Toronto Italia players
Eastern Canada Professional Soccer League players